Ognjen Stijepović (born 22 October 1999) is a Montenegrin professional footballer who plays as a midfielder for Slovenian PrvaLiga club Mura.

Club career
On 19 July 2016, Stijepović made his Champions League debut in a qualifier against Ludogorets, at the age of 16. On 4 January 2018, Stijepović joined Sampdoria from Mladost. Stijepović made his professional debut for Sampdoria in a 1–0 Serie A loss to Sassuolo on 5 May 2018.

On 23 August 2019, he joined Pistoiese on a season-long loan.

On 28 September 2020, he moved on loan to Alessandria.

On 29 January 2021, he was recalled from Alessandria loan and loaned to Grosseto.

On 27 August 2021, he signed a three-year contract with Spezia; on the same day he returned to Pistoiese on loan. On 1 September 2022, Stijepović was loaned to Imolese.

In January 2023, Stijepović left Spezia and joined Slovenian PrvaLiga side Mura on a contract until 2025.

International career
Stijepović was a youth international for Montenegro. He scored and assisted on his debut for the under-21 team in a 3–1 UEFA European Under-21 Championship qualification win over Luxembourg on 23 March 2018.

References

External links
 
 
 
 
 Sampdoria Profile

1999 births
Living people
Footballers from Podgorica
Montenegrin footballers
Association football midfielders
Montenegrin First League players
Serie A players
Serie C players

OFK Titograd players
U.C. Sampdoria players
U.S. Pistoiese 1921 players
U.S. Alessandria Calcio 1912 players
U.S. Grosseto 1912 players
Spezia Calcio players
Imolese Calcio 1919 players
NŠ Mura players
Montenegrin expatriate footballers
Montenegrin expatriate sportspeople in Italy
Expatriate footballers in Italy
Montenegrin expatriate sportspeople in Slovenia
Expatriate footballers in Slovenia
Montenegro youth international footballers
Montenegro under-21 international footballers